Mette Bloch Jensen (born 13 February 1966) is a Danish rower. In the 1992 World Rowing Championships, she won a gold medal in the lightweight women's single sculls event.

References

See also

1966 births
Danish female rowers
World Rowing Championships medalists for Denmark
Living people